Reynard Motorsport vehicles

The Reynard 02I is an open-wheel racing car chassis designed and built by Reynard Racing Cars that competed in the 2002 IndyCar season. Development continued and its life was extended, and it saw competition in the Champ Car series, between 2003 and 2004.

References

American Championship racing cars
Reynard Motorsport vehicles